Kwon Soo-hyun is a Korean name consisting of the family name Kwon and the given name Soo-hyun, and may also refer to:

 Kwon Soo-hyun (field hockey) (born 1974), South Korean field hockey player
 Kwon Soo-hyun (actor) (born 1986), South Korean actor